Alberto Carelli (born 26 July 1944) is a retired Italian football striker.

References

1944 births
Living people
Italian footballers
Torino F.C. players
Catania S.S.D. players
S.S.D. Varese Calcio players
Mantova 1911 players
Atalanta B.C. players
Parma Calcio 1913 players
Serie A players
Association football forwards
A.S.D. Fanfulla players